Lužany is a municipality and village in Plzeň-South District in the Plzeň Region of the Czech Republic. It has about 700 inhabitants.

Administrative parts
Villages of Dlouhá Louka, Zelená Hora and Zelené are administrative parts of Lužany.

References

Villages in Plzeň-South District